Daniel Bierofka (born 7 February 1979) is a German football coach and a former player. A former left winger, his playing career had been plagued by injuries which limited his chances of playing more matches for the Germany national squad and forced him to retire after the 2013–14 season.

Club career
Bierofka came through the Bayern Munich youth system and made it to the reserve squad but never played for the senior team. He then transferred to city rival 1860 Munich where he played 55 games in two seasons. Bierofka then moved to Bayer Leverkusen for three years before going over to VfB Stuttgart. In the 2006–07 season, Bierofka won the Bundesliga title with VfB Stuttgart. In June 2007, Bierofka returned to 1860 Munich with the club committing to a deferred payment of €400,000.

International career
Bierofka has played three internationals for Germany and scored one goal – on 18 May 2002, in the 6–2 win against Austria in a friendly match.

Coaching career

1860 Munich
After ending his club career at 1860 Munich II in May 2014 Bierofka became head coach of the U-16 squad of his former club. On 18 February 2015 he became the head coach of 1860 Munich II after Torsten Fröhling was appointed head coach of the first team. On 14 March 2015, in his debut, 1860 Munich II and Schalding-Heining finished in a 0–0 draw. In a Bavarian derby, on 21 March 2015, 1860 Munich II lost to 1. FC Nürnberg II 2–0. He finished with a record of four wins, three draws, and five losses.

He took on the first team on 19 April 2016. Under Bierofka's coaching 1860 Munich won its first three matches against Eintracht Braunschweig, FC St. Pauli and SC Paderborn and thereby avoided relegation from the 2. Bundesliga. As Bierofka did not held a coaching license for the 2. Bundesliga he was only allowed to coach with a special permit for three matches. He won all three of his matches. After this permit expired he took over the second team again and was replaced by interim coach Denis Bushuev for the last match of the season against FSV Frankfurt. He was again appointed as the interim head coach on 22 November 2016.

After the first team was relegated from the 2. Bundesliga and failed to obtain a licence for the 3. Liga Bierofka was appointed head coach for the 2017–18 season. He resigned on 7 November 2019.

Wacker Innsbruck
In May 2020, Bierofka signed a contract to become head coach at Wacker Innsbruck from the 2020-21 season. His appointment ended on 7 October 2021.

Personal life
His father  is a former player and former head coach of 1860 Munich.

Career statistics

Club

International goal
Score and result list Germany's goal tally first, score column indicates score after Bierofka goal.

Coaching record

Honours
VfB Stuttgart
 Bundesliga: 2006–07

References

External links

1979 births
Living people
German footballers
Germany international footballers
Germany under-21 international footballers
Germany B international footballers
Association football wingers
VfB Stuttgart players
Bayer 04 Leverkusen players
TSV 1860 Munich players
FC Bayern Munich II players
Bundesliga players
2. Bundesliga players
2. Bundesliga managers
3. Liga managers
TSV 1860 Munich managers
Footballers from Munich
German football managers
Regionalliga players
FC Wacker Innsbruck (2002) managers
German expatriate football managers
Expatriate football managers in Austria
German expatriate sportspeople in Austria